Renato Terra (26 July 1922 in Naples – 28 November 2010 in Rome) had a career working in film as an actor, and has appeared in over 80 movies. In 1977 he retired to become a poet.

He attended the Experimental Center of Cinematography in Rome and also used the alias Ryan Earthpick during his career. During the shooting of a film, he fell from a horse and permanently broke his nose. During his post-actor career as a poet, he published the book Che Strano Paese.

Selected filmography

 The Black Corsair (1938)
 Torna a Napoli (1949) - Nino
 Path of Hope (1950) - Mommino
 Hearts at Sea (1950)
 Vivo di te, shortfilm (1951)

 The Bandit of Tacca Del Lupo (1952)
 I falsari (1953)
 A Husband for Anna (1953) - Il palpeggiatore
 Senso (1954) - Un soldato (uncredited)
 Proibito (1955)
 The Bachelor (1956) - Tiberio
 Nero's Weekend (1956)
 Kean (1957)
 White Nights (1957) - Un coinvolto nella rissa
 Un angelo è sceso a Brooklyn (1957)
 Ragazzi della marina (1957)
 Peppino, le modelle e chella là (1957)
 The Italians They Are Crazy (1958)
 Toto and Marcellino (1958)
 Piece of the Sky (1958) - La guardia giovane (uncredited)
 Giovane canaglia (1958) - complice di Daves
 Il romanzo di un giovane povero (1958)
 Big Deal on Madonna Street (1958) - Eladio
 The Law Is the Law (1958)
 La sfida (1958)
 Carmela è una bambola (1958) - Silvio
 Pia de' Tolomei (1958)
 Tuppe tuppe, Marescià! (1958)
 Destinazione Sanremo (1959)
 Le cameriere (1959)
 Goliath and the Barbarians (1959)
 Un maledetto imbroglio (1959) - Man at the Notary's
 David and Goliath (1960)
 Carthage in Flames (1960)
 The Angel Wore Red (1960) (uncredited)
 Goliath and the Dragon (1960) - Antoneos
 Black Sunday (1960) - Boris
 Rocco and His Brothers (1960) - Alfredo, Ginetta's brother
 I'll See You in Hell (1960)
 Robin Hood and the Pirates (1960) - Barbanera
 Constantine and the Cross (1961) Jailer
 The Seven Revenges (1961)
 Gioventù di notte (1961) - Brigadiere
 I tartari (1961)
 Goliath and the Vampires (1961)
 Il brigante (1961)
 Accattone (1961) - Farlocco #2
 Black City (1961) - Un agente
 Maciste contro Ercole nella valle dei guai (1961)
 The Giant of Metropolis (1961) - Il Giovane Scienzato
 Accroche-toi, y'a du vent! (1961)
 The Italian Brigands (1961) - Il Brigante
 Madame (1961) - Un sans-culotte (uncredited)
 I due marescialli (1961)
 Disorder (1962)
 Alone Against Rome (1962) - Gladiator Trainer
 Night Train to Milan (1962) - Sottufficiale di polizia
 Toto and Peppino Divided in Berlin (1962) - 9
 Sodom and Gomorrah (1962) - (uncredited)
 Agostino (1962)
 Carmen di Trastevere (1962) - Gerardo, a Latin Lover
 Il mare (1962)
 The Four Monks (1962) - Un paesano
 Uno strano tipo (1963)
 The Fall of Rome (1963)
 Il monaco di Monza (1963)
 Il Fornaretto di Venezia (1963)
 Hands over the City (1963) - Giornalista (uncredited)
 Hercules Against the Mongols (1963) - Karikan
 I 4 tassisti (1963)
 Liolà (1964)
 None But the Lonely Spy (1964) - Policeman
 Love in Four Dimensions (1964) - (segment "Amore e alfabeto")
 L'ultima carica (1964)
 Hercules Against the Barbarians (1964)
 La vita agra (1964)
 Grand Canyon Massacre (1964) - Curly Mason
 Sette contro la morte (1964)
 Castle of the Living Dead (1964) - Policeman
 I due evasi di Sing Sing (1964) - Jim Doris
 The Gospel According to St. Matthew (1964) - Un indemoniato
 Intrigo a Los Angeles (1964) - Elston
 Un mostro e mezzo (1964)
 Ali Baba and the Seven Saracens (1964) - Saracen Leader
 Una storia di notte (1964)
 Il vendicatore mascherato (1964)
 Tres dólares de plomo (1964)
 The Revenge of Ivanhoe (1965) - Tuck
 Letti sbagliati (1965)
 The Dirty Game (1965)
 La violenza e l'amore (1965)
 I complessi (1965) - (segment "Il Complesso della Schiava nubiana")
 The Dreamer (1965)
 Man from Canyon City (1965)
 Thrilling (1965) - (segment "L'autostrada del sole")
 Seven Golden Men (1965)
 Agente S 03: Operazione Atlantide (1965) - Fatima's Henchman (uncredited)
 I Knew Her Well (1965) - Man in the caravan
 Made in Italy (1965) - Immigrant (segment "6, Final episode")
 Weekend, Italian Style (1965) - Giovanni - the valet
 Lo scippo (1965)
 Seven Golden Men Strike Again (1966)
 Me, Me, Me... and the Others (1966)
 Seven Dollars on the Red (1966) - Manuel
 Savage Gringo (1966)
 Wake Up and Die (1966)
 The Mona Lisa Has Been Stolen (1966)
 Knives of the Avenger (1966) - Hagen's Henchman (uncredited)
 Tabú (1966) - (uncredited)
 Kiss the Girls and Make Them Die (1966)
 Kill or Be Killed (1966) - Doctor
 Eroe vagabondo (1966)
 Ballata da un miliardo (1967)
 Requiescant (1967) - Alonso
 Gente d'onore (1967)
 Delitto a Posillipo - Londra chiama Napoli (1967)
 Requiescant (1967)
 El 'Che' Guevara (1969) - Sergeant
 Le lys de mer (1969)
 Ma chi t'ha dato la patente? (1970)
 Brother Sun, Sister Moon (1972)
 L'arbitro (1974)
 Paolo il freddo (1974)
 Jesus of Nazareth (1977, TV Mini-Series) - Abel

References

Male actors from Naples
Italian male poets
1922 births
2010 deaths
20th-century Italian poets
20th-century Italian male writers